W9 is a French television network available through digital terrestrial television TNT, satellite and ADSL. It is a subsidiary of the Groupe M6; the name W9 has been selected for the channel because "W9" is a mirror written equivalent of "M6", and as it was the nation's ninth broadcast network.

History 

The name W9 was invented by Les Inconnus in the early 90s with a sketch that spoofed M6's music programming at the time, with the logo being a rotated version of M6's. The sketch portrays the interaction between Roxane (played by Pascal Légitimus) with an American accent who wants to ask Michel (played by Bernard Campan) about the name of the excerpt of the song that was being played.

Before getting a terrestrial license, W9 was M6 music, a satellite channel launched on 1 March 1998. The channel was replaced by M6 Music Hits on the day W9 launched.
W9 is one of the first channels of TNT France (French DVB-T).

Programming

Musical magazine programs 
@vos clips
 talents

 
e-classement 
Wake up
W9 hits 
Talent tout neuf

Magazine programs 
, society magazine program
, murder magazine program
Au Cœur de l'étrange, paranormal magazine program
Vies croisées, life magazine program
Turbo, motor magazine program
Fan de stars, celebrities magazine program
Un dîner presque parfait

Reality shows 
Cauchemar en cuisine (US & UK version of Kitchen Nightmares)
Hotel hell (US version of Hotel Hell)
Le Convoi de l'extrême (US version of Ice Road Truckers)
Ax men (US version of Ax Men)
Swamp people: chasseurs de croco
Les Marseillais à Miami
Les Chtis à ibiza
Les Chtis font du ski
Les Chtis débarquent à Mykonos
Les Chtis à Las Vegas
La Meileure Danse (dance contributes)Popstars (song contributes)
 Les Marseillais vs le reste du monde Series 
Now
 Agents of S.H.I.E.L.D. Beauty and the Beast Ben and Kate Criminal Minds: Suspect Behavior Empire Glee Kaamelott Lie to Me Malcolm Medium Smallville Soda Sons of Anarchy Spartacus : Le Sang des gladiateurs Spartacus : Les Dieux de l'arène Spartacus : Vengeance 
 The Finder The Glades Un gars, une filleold series
 90210 Beverly Hills : Nouvelle Génération Anges de choc Babylon 5 Blind Justice Britannia High Buffy the Vampire Slayer (Buffy contre les vampires) Burn Notice (saison 1)
 Cellule Identité Charmed CIB : Criminal Investigation Bureau Cosby Show Dark Angel Dead Zone Destins croisés De la Terre à la Lune : Dinotopia (miniseries) Dinotopia Dock 13 Duval et Moretti Empire Entourage Friends Fugitifs : police spéciale GSG9, missions spéciales Haunted Hex : La Malédiction Highlander: The Series Hôtel Babylon Jake 2.0 Jericho John Doe Jonny Zéro Journeyman Kevin Hill Kidnapped Killer Instinct Kung Fu, la légende continue Kyle XY Largo Winch Le Caméléon Le Clown Le Flic de Shanghaï Le Monde perdu Les Anges du bonheur Les Bleus, premiers pas dans la police Les 4400 Les Allumeuses Los Angeles Heat Ma famille d'abord Merci, les enfants vont bien Missing : Disparus sans laisser de trace Mysterious Ways : Les Chemins de l'étrange Nash Bridges NIH : Alertes médicales Nick Cutter et les Portes du temps (saison 1)
 Nip/Tuck Numb3rs Notre belle famille Odyssey 5 Pandemic : virus fatal Poltergeist : Les Aventuriers du surnaturel Prehistoric Park Prison Break Roswell Sept jours pour agir Sex and the City Sheena, Reine de la Jungle Shérifs à Los Angeles SMS, des rêves plein la tête Special Unit 2 Star Trek : La Nouvelle Génération Stargate SG-1 (seasons 5–6)
 Sue Thomas: F.B.Eye (Sue Thomas: L'oeil du FBI) Summerland Sydney Fox, l'aventurière Terra Nova The Evidence : Les Preuves du crime The Lost Room The Sentinel The Unit : Commando d'élite Totally Frank Touche pas à mes filles Tout le monde déteste Chris Two Un, dos, tres 
 Urgence disparitions Vanished Veronica Mars Wanted Women's Murder Club Animated 

 New Girl
 The Simpsons (January 2, 2006 – present)
 My wife and kids
 Malcolm in the Middle (March 5, 2007 – July 27, 2018)
 SODA (French creation)
 South Park (May 2, 2008 - present)

 Award 
 W9 Music Live M6 dj experience M6 game contest''

W9 HD 
The channel is available in HD since August 1, 2011.

Share

Frequency
 Eutelsat 5 West A (ex-Atlantic Bird 3)
 Eutelsat 9A (ex-Eurobird 9A)
 Eutelsat Hot Bird 13A (ex-Hotbird 6)
 Astra 1N

References

External links
 Official Site 

Television stations in France
French-language television stations
Television channels and stations established in 2005
2005 establishments in France
RTL Group